The 1898 SAFA season was the 22nd edition of the top level of Australian Rules football to be played in South Australia. South Adelaide went on to record its 7th premiership.

Ladder

Finals Series

SAFA Grand Final

References 

SAFA
South Australian National Football League seasons